Scotts or Scott's may refer to:

Businesses and brands
Scott's (restaurant), in London
Scott's Food & Pharmacy, an American supermarket chain
Scotts Miracle-Gro Company, an American multinational corporation 
Scott's Porage Oats, a Scottish breakfast cereal
Scotts Shipbuilding and Engineering Company, a Scottish shipbuilding company 1711–1993

Places
Scotts, Michigan, U.S.
Scotts, North Carolina, U.S.
Scotts Valley, California, U.S.

Other uses
 Scotts (band), a Swedish music group
 "The Scotts", a 2020 song by The Scotts (Travis Scott and Kid Cudi)

See also

 Scots (disambiguation)
 Scotch (disambiguation) 
 Scottish (disambiguation)
 Scotts Bluff National Monument, in Nebraska, U.S.